The 1972 Protocol amending the Single Convention on Narcotic Drugs was a protocol that made several changes to the Single Convention on Narcotic Drugs. It highlighted the need for treatment and rehabilitation of drug addicts, instructing parties to take "all practicable measures for the prevention of abuse of psychotropic substances and for the early identification, treatment, education, after-care, rehabilitation, and social reintegration of the persons involved". It also expanded the International Narcotics Control Board from 11 members to 13 members.

In addition, the Protocol added Article 21 bis, Limitation of Production of Opium, which allowed the Board to deduct from a nation's opium production quota the amounts it determines have been produced within that nation and introduced into the illicit traffic. This could happen as a result of failing to control either illicit production or diversion of licitly produced opium to illicit purposes. In this way, the Board can essentially punish a nation that does not control its illicit opium traffic by imposing an economic sanction on its medicinal opium industry. This provision is ineffective on nations that are not opium exporters.

The Protocol also adds a provision to Article 22 stating that "A Party prohibiting cultivation of the opium poppy or the cannabis plant shall take appropriate measures to seize any plants illicitly cultivated and destroy them, except for small quantities required by the Party for scientific and research purposes". The effect of this amendment is to require nations to actually enforce the laws on their books against cultivation of illicit drugs.

The Protocol adds a provision to Article 36 allowing for "treatment, education, after-care, rehabilitation and social reintegration" as an alternative to incarceration of drug abusers.

A Commentary to the Protocol was written by Adolf Lande, former Secretary of the Permanent Central Narcotics Board and Drug Supervisory Body, under the responsibility of the United Nations Office of Legal Affairs. The Commentary was designed to help nations interpret the Convention.

As of 2013, the Protocol has been ratified by 125 states. It was initially signed by 54 states.

References

External links
Signatures and ratifications .
Commentary on the Protocol Amending the Single Convention on Narcotic Drugs.
Gatto, Christopher: European Drug Policy: Analysis and Case Studies , NORML Foundation, 1999.
INCB ANNUAL REPORT, Feb. 23, 1999.

Drug control treaties
Protocol amending the Single Convention on Narcotic Drugs
Protocol amending the Single Convention on Narcotic Drugs
United Nations treaties
Treaties of Algeria
Treaties of Angola
Treaties of Antigua and Barbuda
Treaties of Argentina
Treaties of Australia
Treaties of Austria
Treaties of the Bahamas
Treaties of Bangladesh
Treaties of Barbados
Treaties of Belarus
Treaties of Belgium
Treaties of the Republic of Dahomey
Treaties of Botswana
Treaties of the military dictatorship in Brazil
Treaties of Brunei
Treaties of Bulgaria
Treaties of Cameroon
Treaties of Canada
Treaties of Chile
Treaties of Colombia
Treaties of Costa Rica
Treaties of Ivory Coast
Treaties of Croatia
Treaties of Cuba
Treaties of Cyprus
Treaties of the Czech Republic
Treaties of Czechoslovakia
Treaties of Zaire
Treaties of Denmark
Treaties of Djibouti
Treaties of Dominica
Treaties of the Dominican Republic
Treaties of Ecuador
Treaties of Egypt
Treaties of Eritrea
Treaties of the Transitional Government of Ethiopia
Treaties of Fiji
Treaties of Finland
Treaties of France
Treaties of West Germany
Treaties of East Germany
Treaties of Greece
Treaties of Guatemala
Treaties of Guinea-Bissau
Treaties of Haiti
Treaties of the Holy See
Treaties of Honduras
Treaties of the Hungarian People's Republic
Treaties of Iceland
Treaties of India
Treaties of Indonesia
Treaties of Iran
Treaties of Ba'athist Iraq
Treaties of Ireland
Treaties of Israel
Treaties of Italy
Treaties of Jamaica
Treaties of Japan
Treaties of Jordan
Treaties of Kazakhstan
Treaties of Kenya
Treaties of Kuwait
Treaties of Laos
Treaties of Latvia
Treaties of Lebanon
Treaties of Lesotho
Treaties of the Libyan Arab Jamahiriya
Treaties of Liechtenstein
Treaties of Luxembourg
Treaties of Madagascar
Treaties of Malawi
Treaties of Malaysia
Treaties of Mali
Treaties of Mauritius
Treaties of Mexico
Treaties of Monaco
Treaties of the Mongolian People's Republic
Treaties of Montenegro
Treaties of Morocco
Treaties of Myanmar
Treaties of the Netherlands
Treaties of New Zealand
Treaties of Nicaragua
Treaties of Niger
Treaties of Norway
Treaties of Pakistan
Treaties of Panama
Treaties of Papua New Guinea
Treaties of Paraguay
Treaties of Peru
Treaties of the Philippines
Treaties of Poland
Treaties of Portugal
Treaties of South Korea
Treaties of Moldova
Treaties of the Socialist Republic of Romania
Treaties of Russia
Treaties of San Marino
Treaties of Senegal
Treaties of Serbia and Montenegro
Treaties of Seychelles
Treaties of Singapore
Treaties of Slovakia
Treaties of South Africa
Treaties of Spain
Treaties of Sri Lanka
Treaties of Saint Kitts and Nevis
Treaties of Saint Vincent and the Grenadines
Treaties of the Republic of the Sudan (1985–2011)
Treaties of Suriname
Treaties of Sweden
Treaties of Switzerland
Treaties of Syria
Treaties of Thailand
Treaties of North Macedonia
Treaties of Togo
Treaties of Tonga
Treaties of Trinidad and Tobago
Treaties of Tunisia
Treaties of Turkey
Treaties of Uganda
Treaties of Ukraine
Treaties of the United Kingdom
Treaties of the United States
Treaties of Uruguay
Treaties of Venezuela
Treaties of Yugoslavia
Treaties of Zambia
1972 in Switzerland
Treaties extended to Aruba
Treaties extended to the Netherlands Antilles
Treaties extended to Niue
Treaties extended to Tokelau
Treaties extended to the Faroe Islands
Treaties extended to Greenland
Treaties extended to Guernsey
Treaties extended to Jersey
Treaties extended to the Isle of Man
Treaties extended to Saint Christopher-Nevis-Anguilla
Treaties extended to Bermuda
Treaties extended to the British Virgin Islands
Treaties extended to the Cayman Islands
Treaties extended to the Falkland Islands
Treaties extended to Gibraltar
Treaties extended to Montserrat
Treaties extended to Saint Helena, Ascension and Tristan da Cunha
Treaties extended to the Turks and Caicos Islands
Treaties extended to British Antigua and Barbuda
Treaties extended to British Saint Lucia
Treaties extended to British Saint Vincent and the Grenadines
Treaties extended to British Honduras
Treaties extended to Brunei (protectorate)
Treaties extended to the Gilbert and Ellice Islands
Treaties extended to British Hong Kong
Treaties extended to the British Solomon Islands
Treaties extended to Portuguese Macau
Treaties extended to French Guiana
Treaties extended to French Polynesia
Treaties extended to the French Southern and Antarctic Lands
Treaties extended to Guadeloupe
Treaties extended to Martinique
Treaties extended to Mayotte
Treaties extended to Réunion
Treaties extended to New Caledonia
Treaties extended to Saint Pierre and Miquelon
Treaties extended to Wallis and Futuna
Treaties extended to West Berlin